1877 in sports describes the year's events in world sport.

Athletics
USA Outdoor Track and Field Championships

American football
College championship
 College football national championship – Yale Bulldogs 
Events
 Disagreement about the number of players per team prevents Yale Bulldogs from joining Columbia Lions, Harvard Crimson and Princeton Tigers in the Intercollegiate Football Association

Association football
England
 FA Cup final – The Wanderers 2–1 Oxford University at The Oval (after extra time).
 A major step towards unity in football is achieved when the Sheffield FA joins The Football Association after the FA Laws are amended to effect an agreed compromise.  One significant change to the Laws is the introduction of the throw–in to replace the kick–in.
 Wolverhampton Wanderers founded as St Luke's FC by staff and pupils of St Luke's School in Blakenhall.  The present name will be adopted in 1879 after St Luke's merges with Blakenhall Wanderers Cricket Club.
Scotland
 Scottish Cup final – Vale of Leven 3–2 Rangers (second replay after two 1–1 draws)
 Establishment of Clyde FC at Rutherglen and St Mirren FC at Paisley.
Wales
 5 March — Wales plays its first home international match at the Racecourse Ground in Wrexham against Scotland.  Scotland wins 2–0.

Australian rules football
Events
 The South Australian Football Association is formed on 30 April.  The first premiers are South Adelaide FC
 The Victorian Football Association (now called the Victorian Football League) is formed on 17 May and is the highest level of the sport in Victoria until surpassed in 1897 by the breakaway Victorian Football League (now known as the Australian Football League).  The first premiers are Carlton FC.

Baseball
National championship
 National League champions – Boston Red Caps
Events
 Star pitcher Jim Devlin and three other Louisville Grays are permanently expelled from the National League for arranging with gamblers to lose games.  (Louisville finishes seven games behind Boston.)

Boxing
Events
 Future world champion John L. Sullivan begins his career by fighting as an amateur in his native Boston.  He wins his earliest known bout against Jack Scannell with a first-round knockout.

Cricket
Events
 15–19 March — Australia v. England at Melbourne Cricket Ground (MCG) will afterwards be recognised as the first-ever Test match. Australia win by 45 runs with Charles Bannerman scoring 165*: the first Test century. William Midwinter, with 5–78 in England's first innings, is the first bowler to take five wickets in a Test innings.
 31 March to 4 April — Australia v. England in the Second Test, also at the MCG. England win by 4 wickets.
 10 & 12 November  — South Australia v. Tasmania at Adelaide Oval is the earliest first-class match played by South Australia who win by an innings and 13 runs, their team including George Giffen.
England
 Champion County –  Gloucestershire
 Most runs – W. G. Grace 1,474 @ 39.83 (HS 261)
 Most wickets – W. G. Grace 179 @ 12.81 (BB 9–55)
Australia
 Most runs – Charles Bannerman (HS 165*) and George Ulyett (HS 94) score 243 runs each @ 48.60
 Most wickets – Alfred Shaw 17 wickets @ 11.76 (BB 5–19)

Golf
Major tournaments
 British Open – Jamie Anderson

Horse racing
England
 Grand National – Austerlitz
 1,000 Guineas Stakes – Belphoebe
 2,000 Guineas Stakes – Chamant
 The Derby – Silvio
 The Oaks – Placida
 St. Leger Stakes – Silvio
Australia
 Melbourne Cup – Chester
Canada
 Queen's Plate – Amelia
Ireland
 Irish Grand National – Thiggin-Thue
 Irish Derby Stakes – Redskin
USA
 Kentucky Derby – Baden-Baden
 Preakness Stakes – Cloverbrook
 Belmont Stakes – Cloverbrook

Ice hockey
 First set of ice hockey rules are published in the Montreal Gazette. 
 Founding of McGill University Hockey Club.

Lacrosse
Events
 November — inaugural intercollegiate game is held between New York University and Manhattan College

Rowing
The Boat Race
 24 March — the result of the 34th Oxford and Cambridge Boat Race is a dead heat

Rugby football
Events
 Establishment of Broughton Rangers, Newcastle RFC, Nottingham R.F.C. and Olney RFC

Tennis
England
 Inaugural Lawn Tennis Championship held at All England Lawn Tennis and Croquet Club in Wimbledon, south London.  The first tournament stages only the men's singles championship won by Spencer Gore (England) who defeats William Marshall (England) in the final by 6–1, 6–2, 6–4.
The 1st pre-open era 1877 Men's Tennis tour gets underway 3 tournaments are staged this year between 19 July – 9 October 1877.

Notes

 
Sports by year